Monroe Center is a village in Ogle County, Illinois, United States, southeast of Rockford in Monroe Township. It is located on the Canadian Pacific Railway and on Illinois Route 72, about .6 mile east of Exit 111 from Interstate 39. The village had a population of 471 at the 2010 census. The controversial Great Lakes Basin Railroad is planned to run through Monroe Center.

Geography

Monroe Center is on a hill and has many fields surrounding it. The Kilbuck Creek along with the retainment ponds and lakes alongside I-39 are the only bodies of water in the area.

Demographics

Notable person
Charles W. Baker (1876-1953), Illinois state legislator and farmer, was born in Monroe Center.
Andra Martin (born Sandra Rehn) (1935–2022), American Actor, grew up on the family farm in Monroe Center.

References

External links

2005 Estimates

Villages in Ogle County, Illinois
Villages in Illinois